Henry Bowyer (9 March 1786 – 18 October 1853) was a British politician.

Bowyer was the third son of Sir George Bowyer, 5th Baronet. He attended Eton College between 1799 and 1802 and graduated from Christ Church, Oxford in 1805. He never married.

Having originally intended to be a priest, Bowyer was elected as the Member of Parliament (MP) for Abingdon at a by-election in December 1809, following the death of its incumbent member George Knapp. Bowyer stood in the election as a substitute candidate for his eldest brother, George Bowyer. His brother had infringed the Treating Act and had become vulnerable to a petition against him. He held the seat for less than two years until his resignation in June 1811 by appointment as Steward of the Chiltern Hundreds.
Bowyer never spoke in parliament during his time in office. His brother George was subsequently elected in June 1811. Bowyer became the rector of Sunningwell in Berkshire from 1812 until his death in 1853.

References

External links

1786 births
1853 deaths
19th-century English Anglican priests
Alumni of Christ Church, Oxford
Members of the Parliament of the United Kingdom for English constituencies
People educated at Eton College
People from Radley
UK MPs 1807–1812